Jerome Francis McCabe (born January 25, 1965) is a former American football linebacker who played for the New England Patriots and the Kansas City Chiefs of the National Football League (NFL). He played college football at College of the Holy Cross.

References 

1965 births
Living people
American football linebackers
Holy Cross Crusaders football players
New England Patriots players
Kansas City Chiefs players